The Asia Pacific Screen Award for Achievement in Directing has been given annually by the Asia Pacific Screen Academy since 2007.

Winners and Nominees

2000s

2010s

References

External links

Directing
Film directing awards
Lists of films by award